Margaritas is a Mexican restaurant chain in New England. Founded by John Pelletier in 1985 in Concord, NH. His first venture opened as Tio Juan's. With partner Stan Bagley, he opened the first Tio Juan's Mexican Restaurant in Orono, ME. Shortly after, his brother Dave joined the venture.  Since then, the company has grown to 18 corporate locations across New England, and new franchise stores opening in the Mid Atlantic, like locations in Tom's River, NJ and Lansdale, PA. The company is the most prominent TexMex casual dining experience in New England.  

Their use of art and furniture directly from central Mexico is one key feature that makes them stand out from other restaurants. Following this theme, the restaurant blends traditional Mexican cuisine with standard Tex-Mex fare for a New England palate. The restaurant prides itself on remaining a true scratch kitchen even while evolving into a corporation as well as remaining a fast, casual, family-oriented place to eat.

References

External links 

Regional restaurant chains in the United States
Mexican restaurants in the United States
Companies based in New Hampshire
Companies based in Rockingham County, New Hampshire
Companies based in Portsmouth, New Hampshire